M. rubra  may refer to:
 Marmosa rubra, the red mouse opossum, a South American marsupial species
 Mesogona rubra, a moth species found in the Cascade Mountains north to Skamania County, Washington, United States
 Microhyla rubra, a narrow-mouthed frog species found in India
 Miomantis rubra, a praying mantis species
 Morus rubra, the red mulberry, a plant species native to eastern North America
 Mycteroperca rubra, the mottled grouper, a fish species
 Myrica rubra, the yangmei or Chinese strawberry tree, a subtropical tree species
 Myrmica rubra, the European fire ant or common red ant, an ant species found all over Europe

See also
 Rubra (disambiguation)